King Andrianmanotronavalonimerina was the King of Ambohidrabiby (now part of Madagascar) in the 18th century, following the death of his father, King Andriamasinavalona in 1710, though he held Ambohidrabiby as a principality even before this date. He was later defeated by his brother, King Andriantsimitoviaminiandriana Andriandrazaka and was forced to retreat into exile into the area around Anjafy and Anativolo, where he died.

He had issue a son named Prince Andrianavakondambozafy.

Malagasy monarchs
18th-century monarchs in Africa